The 2004 All-Big 12 Conference football team consists of American football players chosen as All-Big 12 Conference players for the 2004 Big 12 Conference football season.  The conference recognizes two official All-Big 12 selectors: (1) the Big 12 conference coaches selected separate offensive and defensive units and named first- and second-team players (the "Coaches" team); and (2) a panel of sports writers and broadcasters covering the Big 12 also selected offensive and defensive units and named first- and second-team players (the "Media" team).

Offensive selections

Quarterbacks

 Jason White, Oklahoma (Coaches-1; Media-1)
 Reggie McNeal, Texas A&M (Coaches-2; Media-2)

Running backs

 Adrian Peterson, Oklahoma (Coaches-1; Media-1)
 Cedric Benson, Texas (Coaches-1; Media-1)
 Vernand Morency, Oklahoma State (Coaches-2; Media-2)
 Darren Sproles, Kansas State (Coaches-2; Media-2)

Centers

 Vince Carter, Oklahoma (Coaches-1; Media-1)
 Dylan Gandy, Texas Tech (Media-2)

Guards

 Sam Mayes, Oklahoma State (Coaches-1; Media-1)
 Joe Vaughn, Kansas (Coaches-2; Media-2)
 Tony Palmer, Missouri (Coaches-2)
 Cale Stubbe, Iowa State (Coaches-2)
 Davin Joseph, Oklahoma (Media-2)

Tackles

 Jammal Brown, Oklahoma (Coaches-1; Media-1)
 Jonathan Scott, Texas (Coaches-1; Media-1)
 Justin Blalock, Texas (Coaches-1; Media-2)
 Jeromey Clary, Kansas State (Coaches-2)
 Daniel Loper, Texas Tech (Media-2)

Tight ends

 Bo Scaife, Texas (Coaches-1)
 Billy Bajema, Oklahoma State (Media-1)
 David Thomas, Texas (Coaches-2; Media-2)
 Brian Casey, Kansas State (Coaches-2)
 Joe Klopfenstein, Colorado (Coaches-2)

Receivers

 Mark Clayton, Oklahoma (Coaches-1; Media-1)
 Terrence Murphy, Texas A&M (Coaches-1; Media-2)
 Jarrett Hicks, Texas Tech (Coaches-2; Media-1)
 Todd Blythe, Iowa State (Media-2)

Defensive selections

Defensive linemen

 Dan Cody, Oklahoma (Coaches-1; Media-1)
 Mike Montgomery, Texas A&M (Coaches-1; Media-1)
 David McMillan, Kansas (Coaches-1; Media-2)
 Atiyyah Ellison, Missouri (Coaches-1)
 Nick Leaders, Iowa State (Coaches-1)
 C. J. Mosley, Missouri (Media-1)
 Adell Duckett, Texas Tech (Coaches-2; Media-1)
 Jonathan Jackson, Oklahoma (Coaches-2; Media-1)
 Larry Dibbles, Texas (Coaches-2; Media-2)
 Rodrique Wright, Texas (Coaches-2; Media-2)

Linebackers

 Barrett Ruud, Nebraska (Coaches-1; Media-1)
 Lance Mitchell, Oklahoma (Coaches-1; Media-1)
 Derrick Johnson, Texas (Coaches-1; Media-1)
 Nick Reid, Kansas (Coaches-2; Media-1)
 James Kinney, Missouri (Coaches-2; Media-1)
 Aaron Harris, Texas (Coaches-2)
 Rufus Alexander, Oklahoma (Media-2)
 Justin Crook, Baylor (Media-2)
 Brian Iwuh, Colorado (Media-2)
 Mike Smith, Texas Tech (Media-2)

Defensive backs

 Ellis Hobbs, Iowa State (Coaches-1; Media-1)
 Charles Gordon, Kansas (Coaches-1; Media-1)
 Michael Huff, Texas (Coaches-1; Media-2)
 Donte Nicholson, Oklahoma (Coaches-1)
 Brodney Pool, Oklahoma (Coaches-2; Media-1)
 Jaxon Appel, Texas A&M (Media-1)
 Josh Bullocks, Nebraska (Coaches-2)
 Phillip Geiggar, Texas (Coaches-2)
 Byron Jones, Texas A&M (Coaches-2)
 Maurice Lane, Baylor (Media-2)
 Jason Simpson, Missouri (Media-2)
 Jamie Thompson, Oklahoma State (Media-2)

Special teams

Kickers

 Mason Crosby, Colorado (Coaches-1; Media-1)
 Todd Pregram, Texas A&M (Coaches-2; Media-2)

Punters

 Daniel Sepulveda, Baylor (Coaches-1; Media-1)
 John Torp, Colorado (Coaches-1; Media-1)

All-purpose / Return specialists

 Willie Andrews, Baylor (Coaches-1; Media-2)
 Danny Amendola, Texas Tech (Coaches-1)
 Darren Sproles, Kansas State (Media-1)
 Stephone Robinson, Colorado (Coaches-2)

Key
Bold = selected as a first-team player by both the coaches and media panel

Coaches = selected by Big 12 Conference coaches

Media = selected by a media panel

See also
2004 College Football All-America Team

References

All-Big 12 Conference
All-Big 12 Conference football teams